is a railway station located in the city of Minamiuonuma, Niigata, Japan, operated jointly by the East Japan Railway Company (JR East) and the third sector Hokuetsu Express.

Lines
It is also a terminal station for the Hokuhoku Line, although trains continue on to  via the Joetsu Line.

Station layout

The station has a single side platform and two island platforms serving five tracks. The station has a Midori no Madoguchi staffed ticket office.

Platforms

History

Muikamachi Station opened on 18 November 1923. Upon the privatization of the Japanese National Railways (JNR) on 1 April 1987, it came under the control of JR East.

Passenger statistics
In fiscal 2017, the station was used by an average of 1794 passengers daily (boarding passengers only).

Surrounding area
Muikamachi Post Office

See also
 List of railway stations in Japan

References

External links

 JR East Muikamachi Station 
 Hokuetsu Express Station information 

Railway stations in Niigata Prefecture
Railway stations in Japan opened in 1923
Stations of Hokuetsu Express
Stations of East Japan Railway Company
Jōetsu Line
Minamiuonuma